This article presents a list of the historical events and publications of Australian literature during 1955.

Books 

 Martin Boyd – A Difficult Young Man
 Jon Cleary – Justin Bayard
 Charmian Clift & George Johnston – The Sponge Divers
 Alfred E. Couchman – Fair Field, No Favor
 Dymphna Cusack – The Sun in Exile
 Mary Durack – Keep Him My Country
 Barbara Jefferis – Beloved Lady
 D'Arcy Niland – The Shiralee
 Ruth Park – Pink Flannel
 Colin Roderick – The Lady and the Lawyer
 Nevil Shute – Requiem for a Wren, (aka The Breaking Wave)
 E. V. Timms – They Came from the Sea
 Arthur Upfield – The Battling Prophet
 F. B. Vickers – The Mirage
 Patrick White – The Tree of Man

Short stories 

 A. Bertram Chandler – "Late"
 John Morrison – Black Cargo and Other Stories
 Vance Palmer – Let the Birds Fly
 Dal Stivens – Ironbark Bill

Children's and Young Adult fiction 

 Patricia Wrightson – The Crooked Snake, illustrated by Margaret Horder

Poetry 

 Lex Banning – "Apocalypse in Springtime"
 David Campbell – "Here, Under Pear-Trees"
 Rosemary Dobson – Child with a Cockatoo, and Other Poems
 Max Harris – The Coorong and Other Poems
 A. D. Hope – The Wandering Islands
 Nancy Keesing & Douglas Stewart – Australian Bush Ballads (edited)
 Nancy Keesing – Three Men and Sydney
 James McAuley – Australian Poetry 1955
 Roland Robinson
 "Altjeringa"
 "Passage of the Swans"
 Vivian Smith – "Portuguese Laurel Flowering"
 Douglas Stewart – The Birdsville Track and Other Poems
 Randolph Stow – "Sea Children"
 Chris Wallace-Crabbe – No Glass Houses
 Judith Wright – The Two Fires

Drama 

 Dymphna Cusack – The Golden Girls : A Play in Three Acts
 Ray Lawler – Summer of the Seventeenth Doll

Biography 

 Leonie Kramer – Henry Kingsley : Some Novels of Australian Life
 Alan Marshall – I Can Jump Puddles

Awards and honours

Literary

Children's and Young Adult

Poetry

Births 

A list, ordered by date of birth (and, if the date is either unspecified or repeated, ordered alphabetically by surname) of births in 1955 of Australian literary figures, authors of written works or literature-related individuals follows, including year of death.

 27 March – Linda Jaivin, novelist
 28 March – Tony Shillitoe, novelist
 8 June – Peter Rose, poet and editor
 15 June – Les Wicks, poet and editor
 5 August – Christine Harris, writer for children
 14 September – Geraldine Brooks, novelist

Unknown date
 Candida Baker, novelist and anthologist
 Michael Gerard Bauer, children's and young adult author
 Adrian Caesar, poet
 Martin Flanagan, journalist
 Michael Gow, playwright
 Jennifer Harrison, poet
 Gail Jones, novelist
 Steven Paulsen, sf writer

Deaths 

A list, ordered by date of death (and, if the date is either unspecified or repeated, ordered alphabetically by surname) of deaths in 1955 of Australian literary figures, authors of written works or literature-related individuals follows, including year of birth.

 19 January – Kenneth Mackenzie, poet and novelist (born 1913)
 10 March – Brian Vrepont, poet (born 1882)
 1 August – Charles Shaw, journalist and novelist (born 1900)
 30 December – Rex Ingamells, poet (born 1913)

See also 
 1955 in Australia
 1955 in literature
 1955 in poetry
 List of years in Australian literature
 List of years in literature

References

 
Australian literature by year
20th-century Australian literature
1955 in literature